Vellaswamy Rama Vanitha (born 19 July 1990) is an Indian former cricketer. She played as an opening batter from Karnataka. In January 2014, she made her Women's One Day International (WODI) and Women's Twenty20 International (WT20I) debuts, against Sri Lanka. In February 2022, she retired from all forms of cricket.

Personal life
Vanitha has two sisters and a brother, and her family has been very supportive of her career choice. She used to train with boys at a coaching camp. Her father was the one who took her to the Karnataka Institute of Cricket when she was 11. As a child she often use to play gully cricket with her father and brother which helped in laying a strong foundation for love of cricket very early in her life.

Vanitha studied at Seventh Day Adventist, Bangalore. Later, she studied at CMR Law School as well as MS Ramaiah College of Law. Apart from being a cricketer, she is also an entrepreneur. She launched Orgobliss in 2013, along with her brother.

Career
Vanitha made her debut for Karnataka women's cricket team in 2006. Her coach and mentor Irfan Sait has played an instrumental role in inculcating the required  cricketing skills in her. Dilip, Naseer, Anant Dante and Rajini are the other coaches who helped her in raising her game at different points of her career.

References

1990 births
Living people
Indian women cricketers
India women One Day International cricketers
India women Twenty20 International cricketers
Cricketers from Bangalore
Karnataka women cricketers
Bengal women cricketers